Calaigh Copland (born 12 March 1987) is a footballer who plays as a forward. Born in Canada, she represented the Guyana women's national team.

Early life
Copland was born in Ottawa and raised in Peterborough, Ontario. She later played at the senior amateur level with Peterborough City SC.

College career
From 2006 to 2009, she attended Seneca College, playing for the women's soccer team. She was named an East Division All-Star in the 2008/09 season. 

In 2009, she moved to the Ryerson University. In her debut season with Ryerson, she was named an OUA Second-Team All Star, leading the Rams in goals with six.

Playing career
From 2015 to 2018, she played for Woodbridge Strikers in League1 Ontario. 

In 2019, she played for Durham United FA. 

In 2021, she played for Vaughan Azzurri.

In 2022, she played with North Mississauga SC.

International career
In May 2009, she attended an identification camp for the Canada national team.

At age 28, she joined the Guyana women's national football team after being encouraged to try out for the team by her club level teammate and Guyana national team player Donna Carvalhal, who discovered her Guyanese heritage. She played her first international match in August 2015 and scored her first goal on August 21, 2015 against St. Kitts and Nevis. In February 2016, she played against the country of her birth, Canada, at the 2016 CONCACAF Women's Olympic Qualifying Championship.

International goals
Scores and results list Guyana's goal tally first

References

1987 births
Living people
Citizens of Guyana through descent
Guyanese women's footballers
Women's association football forwards
Guyana women's international footballers
Guyanese people of Canadian descent
Sportspeople from Peterborough, Ontario
Soccer players from Ottawa
Canadian women's soccer players
Seneca College alumni
Toronto Metropolitan University alumni
Canadian sportspeople of Guyanese descent
Vaughan Azzurri (women) players
Pickering FC (women) players
League1 Ontario (women) players
Woodbridge Strikers (women) players
North Mississauga SC (women) players